Igor Tchelychev (born 9 January 1977) is a Russian former professional tennis player.

Tchelychev won two bronze medals in doubles for Russia at the 1995 Summer Universiade and made his only ATP Tour singles main draw appearance at the 1997 St. Petersburg Open, as a wildcard entrant. He was the first player beaten by Roger Federer in a rankings match on the professional tour.

References

External links
 
 

1977 births
Living people
Russian male tennis players
Universiade bronze medalists for Russia
Universiade medalists in tennis
Medalists at the 1995 Summer Universiade